The Xinhuang West railway station or Xinhuangxi railway station is a railway station of the Shanghai–Kunming high-speed railway located in Xinhuang Dong Autonomous County, Hunan, China.

References

Railway stations in Hunan
Railway stations in China opened in 2014